In mathematics, a Heilbronn set is an infinite set S of natural numbers for which every real number can be arbitrarily closely approximated by a fraction whose denominator is in S. For any given real number  and natural number , it is easy to find the integer  such that  is closest to . For example, for the real number  and  we have .

Examples 

The th powers of integers are a Heilbronn set. This follows from a result of I. M. Vinogradov who showed that for every  and  there exists an exponent  and  such that . In the case  Hans Heilbronn was able to show that  may be taken arbitrarily close to 1/2. Alexandru Zaharescu has improved Heilbronn's result to show that  may be taken arbitrarily close to 4/7.

Any Van der Corput set is also a Heilbronn set.

Example of a non-Heilbronn set 
The powers of 10 are not a Heilbronn set. This is not true for all real numbers.

References 

Analytic number theory
Diophantine approximation